Donald E. Johnson (June 5, 1924 – August 10, 1999) was an American businessman who served as the Administrator of Veterans Affairs from 1969 to 1974.

He died of cancer on August 10, 1999, in Fredericksburg, Virginia at age 75.

References

External links

1924 births
1999 deaths
Iowa Republicans
National Commanders of the American Legion
United States Department of Veterans Affairs officials